Menifee (May 4, 1996 – June 13, 2019) was an American Thoroughbred racehorse that competed in the Triple Crown of Thoroughbred Racing in 1999.  His rivalry with Triple Crown contender Charismatic was compared at times with the rivalry between 1978 contenders Affirmed and Alydar, who won and placed respectively in all three races that year. He was trained by W. Elliott Walden and ridden in all three races by Pat Day.

Triple Crown run 
Menifee won a come-from-behind victory in the Blue Grass Stakes at Keeneland in his last Triple Crown prep over the highly regarded Cat Thief, Vicar, Kimberlite Pipe and Wondertross.   With Pat Day riding and coming from far behind, he then placed second with a big late run just coming up a neck short in the Kentucky Derby behind eventual Horse of the Year Charismatic. Two weeks later, in the 1999 Preakness Stakes, he garnered a great deal of support, being sent off as the morning line favorite at 2–1 in a full field of 13 colts and 1 filly (Silverbulletday). In the race, Cat Thief and Vicar took the lead early while Menifee settled into mid-pack at eighth and Charismatic lagged behind in tenth. Around the second turn, Charismatic made a move on the outside and won by 1 1/2 lengths. Menifee passed Cat Thief and Badge to claim the runner-up share of $200,000 in the Preakness Stakes.

Menifee failed to place in the top three in the Belmont Stakes. It was the only time he finished out of the money at age three.

Late three-year-old season 
Following the Triple Crown series in the summer of 1999, Menifee won the Grade I Haskell Invitational Handicap at Monmouth Park Racetrack, finished second in the Super Derby, and ran third in the Travers Stakes. He was retired from racing with 5 wins, 4 places and one show in 11 starts; two of those wins were as a two-year-old in 1998.

Retirement 
Menifee started his stallion career at Stone Farm, where he commanded US $15,000 for a live cover breeding. In October 2006, it was announced that he had been sold to the Korean Racing Association to continue his stallion career at Jeju Stud Farm. He was the leading sire in South Korea from 2012–2019 and became a favorite of Korean racing fans. The horse reportedly quickly learned to respond to Korean phrases, which led Jeju staff to frequently remark that "Menifee speaks Korean."

Menifee died of a heart attack on June 13, 2019 at the age of 23.

References

External links
Menifee's pedigree and photo
Menifee Profile on the Stallion Register
Menifee Profile at Stone Farm

1996 racehorse births
Racehorses bred in Kentucky
Racehorses trained in the United States
Hancock family
Thoroughbred family 16-h
2019 racehorse deaths